Regression is a 2015 psychological thriller horror mystery film directed and written by Alejandro Amenábar. The film stars Ethan Hawke and Emma Watson, with David Thewlis, Lothaire Bluteau, Dale Dickey, David Dencik, Peter MacNeill, Devon Bostick, and Aaron Ashmore in supporting roles.

The film had its world premiere at the San Sebastián International Film Festival on September 18, 2015. It was released in the United States on October 9, 2015, by The Weinstein Company under the banner RADiUS-TWC. The film received mostly negative reviews from critics.

Plot
The film takes place in Minnesota, in 1990. Detective Bruce Kenner (Ethan Hawke) investigates the case of John Gray (David Dencik), who admits to sexually abusing his 17-year-old daughter Angela (Emma Watson) but has no recollection of the abuse. They seek the help of Professor Kenneth Raines (David Thewlis) to use recovered-memory therapy on John Gray to retrieve his memories, and come to suspect that their colleague Detective George Nesbitt (Aaron Ashmore) is involved. They detain him but fail to find evidence against him. Detectives suspect a satanic cult is involved because of Angela's testimony, in which Angela says that she was abused by people in masks and someone took pictures of it.

Bruce and Kenneth meet Angela's estranged brother Roy Gray (Devon Bostick) to inquire about why he left the house. Using the regression technique on him, he recalls hooded figures entering his room while he was young. Bruce and Kenneth suspect Roy's grandmother, Rose Gray (Dale Dickey), has some involvement but find nothing after a search of her house.

Meanwhile, Bruce begins having nightmares involving satanic rituals. Angela tells him that the cult is out to kill her as she has shown her demonic mark to him and that he is in danger as well. She tells him that her mother received miscellaneous calls and saw strange figures staring at her in the street before she herself had an accident. Bruce starts to experience the same things and his nightmares increase in intensity.

Rose jumps from the window of her house after seeing ghostly figures, injuring herself. Bruce meets Angela in the church's cemetery to reassure her and after an emotional outburst, she kisses him. Shocked, Bruce leaves her there and returns to his home. He sees a soup advertisement on the street and recognizes the woman in it as the one he sees in his nightmares. He concludes that his imagination has run away with him. He tells Kenneth that all these past memories are induced by therapy and the whole situation is just the result of mass hysteria. Though the professor is initially resistant to the idea, he too comes to suspect that these memories were not real.

Bruce is attacked by two hooded figures who finally reveal themselves as George and their colleague, Farrell (Aaron Abrams). George was seeking revenge after Bruce detained him as a child molester and ruined his career. Bruce offers to forget the whole situation if George tells him everything he knows. After George reveals things, Bruce confronts Angela about her abuse and she insists she told the truth. Finally Bruce concludes that she was fabricating everything from the beginning as she wanted to escape from her family, whom she thinks are responsible for her mother's death. She wanted to elope with George, as they had a sexual relationship for some time, but he refused to elope with a minor. Angela accused her father in order to escape the house. When Bruce confronts her, she tells him that no one is going to believe him, especially if she tells them that they kissed in the cemetery. Bruce tells John everything but John decides to take the blame and pleads guilty in order to rescue Angela and hopes that she will forgive him one day for being a bad father.

The film ends with a statement that many cases like this were reported before the satanic abuse hysteria faded, and that there was never any proof that such ritualistic abuse by organized Satanic cults existed (presumably referring to assertions made during the Satanic Panic in the U.S. and other countries in the 1980s and early 1990s).

Cast

 Ethan Hawke as Detective Bruce Kenner
 Emma Watson as Angela Gray
 David Thewlis as Professor Kenneth Raines
 Lothaire Bluteau as Reverend Murray
 Dale Dickey as Rose Gray, Angela's grandmother.
 David Dencik as John Gray, Angela's father.
 Peter MacNeill as Police Chief Cleveland
 Devon Bostick as Roy Gray, Angela's brother.
 Aaron Ashmore as Detective George Nesbitt
 Adam Butcher as Brody
 Kristian Bruun as Andrew
 Aaron Abrams as Farrell
 Julian Richings as Tom
 Wendy Lyon as Norma
 Janet Porter as S. Cooper

Production
On October 31, 2013, it was announced that Ethan Hawke would star in the thriller film Regression. On February 5, 2014, Emma Watson joined the film to star with Hawke, and on March 25, David Dencik was added to the cast, playing a man who is arrested in a Minnesota town for allegedly sexually abusing his daughter. On May 23, Devon Bostick was added to the cast of the film.

Alejandro Amenábar directed his own script, while FilmNation Entertainment holds international rights.

Filming
Principal photography began on April 15, 2014, in Mississauga, Ontario, Canada. Emma Watson stated, "First day shooting Regression today – a very cool birthday present xx." On the day, which was her 24th birthday, she filmed a church scene at the University of Toronto Mississauga. Shooting was taking place in Tottenham on May 5. On June 3, it was reported that Watson was back in Toronto to continue the rest of filming after spending some time in the UK and graduating from Brown. Principal photography concluded June 12. On January 28, 2015, the crew filmed several additional scenes or reshoots in Mississauga.

Marketing
On June 10, 2014, TWC-Dimension revealed a first look photo from the film. On February 12, 2015, the first trailer was released, and on February 1, 2016, the U.S. trailer premiered.

Release
In November 2013, TWC-Dimension acquired US distribution rights to the film. The film had its world premiere at the San Sebastián International Film Festival on September 18, 2015. It was released in Spain on October 2, 2015 and in the United Kingdom on October 9, 2015.

Regression was originally set for an August 28, 2015 release in the U.S., but was pulled from the schedule. It was then pushed back to its eventual U.S. theatrical date of February 5, 2016, and was released on Amazon Instant Video thirty days later.

Reception
Regression received generally negative reviews from critics upon release, with criticism focused on the film's third act. Review aggregator website Rotten Tomatoes reported a 14% rating, based on 42 reviews, leaving a rating average of 4.1/10. The site's consensus reads, "Regression boasts a pair of eminently likable leads – neither of whom are able to dislodge the movie from the mire of psychological thriller mediocrity." On Metacritic, the film has a score of 32 out of 100, based on 12 critics, indicating "generally unfavorable reviews."

The film opened at the box office, grossing just $55,039 in its domestic run in theaters. The film would eventually gross 17.7 million USD worldwide, on a budget of 15 million USD. Michael Kermode, of The Guardian, wrote that the film was "largely forgettable fare, but at least its unhysterical heart is in the right place."

Despite a disappointing domestic run at the box office, the film was number one at the weekend box office in Spain from October 4 to the October 11, 2015. In 2015, Regression had the highest opening-weekend gross at the Spanish box office for any homegrown film, earning $2.87 million (€2.55 million). The film garnered 40 percent of the Spanish box office on 370 screens.

See also 
 List of Spanish films of 2015
 Satanic ritual abuse

References

External links
 
 Regression at Rotten Tomatoes
 Regression at Box Office Mojo
 Regression at Library and Archives Canada

2015 films
2015 horror films
2015 psychological thriller films
American mystery thriller films
American psychological thriller films
Canadian mystery thriller films
Canadian psychological thriller films
English-language Canadian films
Films directed by Alejandro Amenábar
Films scored by Roque Baños
Films set in 1990
Films set in Minnesota
Films shot in London
Films shot in Toronto
2010s mystery thriller films
Spanish mystery thriller films
Spanish thriller films
English-language Spanish films
Films produced by Ghislain Barrois
MOD Producciones films
2010s English-language films
2010s American films
2010s Canadian films
2010s Spanish films